Trinitapoli-San Ferdinando di Puglia is a railway station in the Italian town of Trinitapoli and also for San Ferdinando di Puglia, in the Province of Barletta-Andria-Trani, Apulia. The station lies on the Adriatic Railway (Ancona–Lecce). The train services are operated by Trenitalia.

Train services
The station is served by the following service(s):

Regional services (Treno regionale) Foggia - Barletta - Bari

See also
Railway stations in Italy
List of railway stations in Apulia
Rail transport in Italy
History of rail transport in Italy

External links
 

Railway stations in Apulia
Buildings and structures in the Province of Barletta-Andria-Trani